Nanohyla is a genus of frogs in the family Microhylidae. Members of the genus are known as pygmy narrow-mouthed frogs.  The members of the genus are found throughout Southeast Asia in the countries of Vietnam, Laos, Cambodia, Thailand, Malaysia, Brunei, Indonesia and the Philippines.

Taxonomy 
All the members of Nanohyla were formerly placed in Microhyla; however, a 2021 study used morphological and phylogenetic evidence to show that Nanohyla forms a separate lineage from Microhyla and Glyphoglossus.

Species 
There are currently nine species placed in Nanohyla:

 Nanohyla annamensis   (Annam chorus frog)
 Nanohyla annectens   (Larut Hills rice frog)
 Nanohyla arboricola 
 Nanohyla hongiaoensis  
 Nanohyla marmorata 
 Nanohyla nanapollexa 
Nanohyla perparva 
Nanohyla petrigena 
 Nanohyla pulchella

References 

Microhylidae
 
Amphibian genera
Amphibians of Asia
Taxa named by Vladislav A. Gorin
Taxa named by Nikolay A. Poyarkov Jr.
Taxa named by Mark D. Scherz